The 1989 season of the Paraguayan Primera División, the top category of Paraguayan football, was played by 12 teams. The national champions were Olimpia.

Results

Final stage

External links
Paraguay 1989 season at RSSSF

Para
Paraguayan Primera División seasons
1